The men's 1 km time trial at the 2018 Commonwealth Games, was part of the cycling programme, which took place on 8 April 2018.

Records
Prior to this competition, the existing world and Games records were as follows:

Results

References

Men's 1 km time trial
Cycling at the Commonwealth Games – Men's 1 km time trial